A samarium–cobalt (SmCo) magnet, a type of rare-earth magnet, is a strong permanent magnet made of two basic elements: samarium and cobalt.

They were developed in the early 1960s based on work done by Karl Strnat at Wright-Patterson Air Force Base and Alden Ray at the University of Dayton. In particular, Strnat and Ray developed the first formulation of SmCo5.

Samarium–cobalt magnets are generally ranked similarly in strength to neodymium magnets, but have higher temperature ratings and higher coercivity.

Attributes 

Some attributes of samarium-cobalts are:

 Samarium-cobalt magnets are extremely resistant to demagnetization.

 They are expensive and subject to price fluctuations (cobalt is market price sensitive).

 Samarium–cobalt magnets have a strong resistance to corrosion and oxidation resistance, usually do not need to be coated and can be widely used in high temperature and poor working conditions.

 They are brittle, and prone to cracking and chipping. Samarium–cobalt magnets have maximum energy products (BHmax) that range from 14 megagauss-oersteds (MG·Oe) to 33 MG·Oe, that is approx. 112 kJ/m3 to 264 kJ/m3; their theoretical limit is 34 MG·Oe, about 272 kJ/m3.

Sintered samarium–cobalt magnets exhibit magnetic anisotropy, meaning they can only be magnetized in the axis of their magnetic orientation. This is done by aligning the crystal structure of the material during the manufacturing process.

Series 

Samarium–cobalt magnets are available in two "series", namely SmCo5 magnets and Sm2Co17 magnets.

Series 1:5 

These samarium–cobalt magnet alloys (generally written as SmCo5, or SmCo Series 1:5) have one atom of rare-earth samarium per five atoms of cobalt.  By weight this magnet alloy will typically contain 36% samarium with the balance cobalt.  The energy products of these samarium–cobalt alloys range from 16 MG·Oe to 25 MG·Oe, that is, approx. 128–200 kJ/m3.  These samarium–cobalt magnets generally have a reversible temperature coefficient of -0.05%/°C.  Saturation magnetization can be achieved with a moderate magnetizing field.  This series of magnet is easier to calibrate to a specific magnetic field than the SmCo 2:17 series magnets.

In the presence of a moderately strong magnetic field, unmagnetized magnets of this series will try to align their orientation axis to the magnetic field, thus becoming slightly magnetized.  This can be an issue if postprocessing requires that the magnet be plated or coated.  The slight field that the magnet picks up can attract debris during the plating or coating process, causing coating failure or a mechanically out-of-tolerance condition.

Br drifts with temperature and it is one of the important characteristics of magnet performance.  Some applications, such as inertial gyroscopes and travelling wave tubes (TWTs), need to have constant field over a wide temperature range.  The reversible temperature coefficient (RTC) of Br is defined as

(∆Br/Br) x (1/∆T)  × 100%.

To address these requirements, temperature compensated magnets were developed in the late 1970s. For conventional SmCo magnets, Br decreases as temperature increases.  Conversely, for GdCo magnets, Br increases as temperature increases within certain temperature ranges. By combining samarium and gadolinium in the alloy, the temperature coefficient can be reduced to nearly zero.

SmCo5 magnets have a very high coercivity (coercive force); that is, they are not easily demagnetized.  They are fabricated by packing wide-grain lone-domain magnetic powders. All of the magnetic domains are aligned with the easy axis direction. In this case, all of the domain walls are at 180 degrees. When there are no impurities, the reversal process of the bulk magnet is equivalent to lone-domain motes, where coherent rotation is the dominant mechanism. However, due to the imperfection of fabricating, impurities may be introduced in the magnets, which form nuclei. In this case, because the impurities may have lower anisotropy or misaligned easy axes, their directions of magnetization are easier to spin, which breaks the 180° domain wall configuration. In such materials, the coercivity is controlled by nucleation. To obtain much coercivity, impurity control is critical in the fabrication process.

Series 2:17 

These alloys (written as Sm2Co17, or SmCo Series 2:17) are age-hardened with a composition of two atoms of rare-earth samarium per 13–17 atoms of transition metals (TM). The TM content is rich in cobalt, but contains other elements such as iron and copper. Other elements like zirconium, hafnium, and such may be added in small quantities to achieve better heat treatment response. By weight, the alloy will generally contain 25% of samarium. The maximum energy products of these alloys range from 20 to 32 MGOe, what is about 160-260 kJ/m3. These alloys have the best reversible temperature coefficient of all rare-earth alloys, typically being -0.03%/°C. The "second generation" materials can also be used at higher temperatures.

In Sm2Co17 magnets, the coercivity mechanism is based on domain wall pinning. Impurities inside the magnets impede the domain wall motion and thereby resist the magnetization reversal process. To increase the coercivity, impurities are intentionally added during the fabrication process.

Production 

The alloys are typically machined in the unmagnetized state.  Samarium–cobalt should be ground using a wet grinding process (water-based coolants) and a diamond grinding wheel.  The same type of process is required if drilling holes or other features that are confined.  The grinding waste produced must not be allowed to completely dry as samarium–cobalt has a low ignition point.  A small spark, such as that produced with static electricity, can easily initiate combustion.  The resulting fire produced can be extremely hot and difficult to control.

The reduction/melt method and reduction/diffusion method are used to manufacture samarium–cobalt magnets. The reduction/melt method will be described since it is used for both SmCo5 and Sm2Co17 production. The raw materials are melted in an induction furnace filled with argon gas. The mixture is cast into a mold and cooled with water to form an ingot. The ingot is pulverized and the particles are further milled to further reduce the particle size. The resulting powder is pressed in a die of desired shape, in a magnetic field to orient the magnetic field of the particles. Sintering is applied at a temperature of 1100˚C–1250˚C, followed by solution treatment at 1100˚C–1200˚C and tempering is finally performed on the magnet at about 700˚C–900˚C. It then is ground and further magnetized to increase its magnetic properties. The finished product is tested, inspected and packed.

Samarium can be substituted by a portion of other rare-earth elements including praseodymium, cerium, and gadolinium; the cobalt can be substituted by a portion of other transition metals including iron, copper, and zirconium.

Uses 

Fender used one of designer Bill Lawrence's Samarium Cobalt Noiseless series of electric guitar pickups in Fender's Vintage Hot Rod '57 Stratocaster. These pickups were used in American Deluxe Series Guitars and Basses from 2004 until early 2010.

In the mid-1980s some expensive headphones such as the Ross RE-278 used samarium–cobalt "Super Magnet" transducers.

Other uses include:

 High-end electric motors used in the more competitive classes in slotcar racing
 Turbomachinery
 Traveling-wave tube field magnets
 Applications that will require the system to function at cryogenic temperatures or very hot temperatures (over 180 °C)
 Applications in which performance is required to be consistent with temperature change
 Benchtop NMR spectrometers
 Rotary encoders where it performs the function of magnetic actuator

See also

References 

Cobalt alloys
Ferromagnetic materials
Loudspeaker technology
Magnetic alloys
Samarium compounds